Iwonicz-Zdrój,  is a town in Poland, in Subcarpathian Voivodship, in Krosno County. It has 1,831 inhabitants (02.06.2009).

History
Iwonicz-Zdroj is one of Poland's oldest health resorts and spas, dating back to 1578, which was famous outside Poland already in the 18th century. The town lies in the south-eastern part of Podkarpackie voivodship, Krosno province. The town is surrounded on all sides by high mixed forest. This unusual location among hills of Beskid Niski, in the valley of Iwonicki Potok (Iwonicz Stream), undeniably rates Iwonicz highly among those places, which charm guests with their beauty and still immaculately clean air. The Iwonicz climate is described as foothills climate with properties of sub-alpine climate, what is important and advantageous in health resort treatment. The Iwonicz forests create a microclimate around the resort, regulating humidity and temperature of the air, protecting it from winds and are a source of ozone. The resort is situated in the area of the greatest insolation and lowest cloudiness in Poland, which, all-in-all makes it a perfect spot for soothing, refreshing and regenerating the body.

The greatest wealth of Iwonicz land are mineral waters and moor mud, which are natural curative agents. These are chloride-bicarbonate-sodium, fluoride, iodide, boric and bromide waters. They are mainly extracted from geological levels so called second and third Ciężkowice sandstone where they occur close to natural gas and crude oil deposits. They are used for drinking therapy, mineral baths, inhalations and production of iodide-bromine salt.

Hiking trails
 European walking route E8
 Prešov - Miháľov - Kurimka - Dukla - Iwonicz-Zdrój – Rymanów-Zdrój - Puławy – Tokarnia (778 m) – Kamień (717 m) – Komańcza - Cisna - Ustrzyki Górne - Tarnica - Wołosate.

Gallery

See also
Krynica-Zdrój
Kudowa-Zdrój

References

Iwonicz Zdroj
Iwonicz Zdroj
Populated places in the Kingdom of Galicia and Lodomeria
Lwów Voivodeship
Spa towns in Poland

it:Iwonicz-Zdrój